Staré Hamry is a municipality and village in the Frýdek-Místek District in the Moravian-Silesian Region of the Czech Republic. It has about 600 inhabitants.

Etymology
The name Staré Hamry literally means "old hammer mills" and refers to the hammer mills which were here in the 17th century. It was initially called only Hamry, the attribute Staré was added later after hammer mills in Baška ("new hammer mills") were founded.

Geography
Staré Hamry is situated in the Moravian-Silesian Beskids mountain range around the Šance Dam, which lies on the Ostravice River.

Forest covers 87% of the municipal territory. Eastern part of the municipality lies in the historical region of Cieszyn Silesia.

History

Staré Hamry was founded between 1636 and 1639, which is the period from which its first land book came. Politically, it was a part of the Friedek state country, which was a part of the Kingdom of Bohemia. The first hammer mill was built in 1638 and disappeared at the end of the 17th century.

The greatest development of the municipality was at the turn of the 19th and 20th centuries, when it became a recreation area.

After World War I, it became a part of Czechoslovakia. In March 1939, it became a part of Protectorate of Bohemia and Moravia. After World War II, it was restored to Czechoslovakia.

Initially, the village was located only on the right bank of the Ostravice, which formed the border between Czech Silesia and Moravia. In 1951, the northern part of the municipality was split from Staré Hamry and joined with Ostravice; whereas the southern part of Ostravice was split from it and joined with Staré Hamry. Both municipalities now lie on both banks of the Ostravice. In 1969, the Šance Dam was built.

Sights

The landmark of village is the Church of Saint Henry, built in 1863–1865. A monument on the outside of the cemetery wall from 1933 commemorates the social poem Maryčka Magdónova by Petr Bezruč. In the hamlet of Gruň there is the wooden Church of the Virgin Mary, which was built in 1887–1890.

Notable people
Petr Bezruč (1867–1958), poet; often visited Staré Hamry and worked here

References

External links

 

Villages in Frýdek-Místek District